During 2021, tropical cyclones formed in seven major bodies of water, commonly known as tropical cyclone basins. During the year, one hundred forty-five systems have formed and ninety-one were named, including one subtropical depression and excluding one system, which was unofficial. One storm was given two names by the same RSMC. The deadliest tropical cyclone was Typhoon Rai, which caused 410 fatalities in the Philippines and 1 in Vietnam, while the costliest was Hurricane Ida, which caused an estimated $75.25 billion USD in damage after striking Louisiana and the Northeastern United States. Six Category 5 tropical cyclones formed during the year, tying 2003.

Tropical cyclones are primarily monitored by a group of ten warning centers, which have been designated as a Regional Specialized Meteorological Centre (RSMC) or a Tropical Cyclone Warning Center (TCWC) by the World Meteorological Organization. These are the United States National Hurricane Center (NHC) and Central Pacific Hurricane Center, the Japan Meteorological Agency (JMA), the Indian Meteorological Department (IMD), Météo-France (MFR), Indonesia's Badan Meteorologi, Klimatologi, dan Geofisika, the Australian Bureau of Meteorology (BOM), Papua New Guinea's National Weather Service, the Fiji Meteorological Service (FMS) as well as New Zealand's MetService. Other notable warning centers include the Philippine Atmospheric, Geophysical, and Astronomical Services Administration (PAGASA), the United States Joint Typhoon Warning Center (JTWC), and the Brazilian Navy Hydrographic Center (BNHC).

Global atmospheric and hydrological conditions

The La Niña from the previous year persisted into 2021, though by March and April it had begun to weaken. On May 13, the National Oceanic and Atmospheric Administration (NOAA) assessed that the El Niño–Southern Oscillation (ENSO) transitioned into its neutral phase. However, following cooler than normal temperatures in the tropical eastern Pacific Ocean, NOAA declared that the global weather conditions shifted back to La Niña by October.

Two systems, Tropical Depression 05 and Severe Tropical Storm Danilo persisted into 2021 after developing within the South-West Indian Ocean during December 2020. The COVID-19 pandemic disrupted responses and recovery in areas affected by tropical cyclones.

Summary

North Atlantic Ocean 

The 2021 Atlantic hurricane season officially ran from June 1 to November 30. A total of 21 tropical depressions formed, all of which reached at least tropical or subtropical intensity. The season ranks as the third-most active of all time in the Atlantic basin, behind only 2005 and 2020. Consequently, the 2021 Atlantic hurricane season was the third on record to exhaust its naming list. Nine of the systems lasted for two days or less, tied with 2007 for the most since the NHC began monitoring subtropical systems in 1968. Although the season was highly active in terms of the number of named storms, seven of those tropical or subtropical systems intensified into a hurricane and four of those became a major hurricane, which is near-average and just slightly above-average, respectively. Nonetheless, 2021 marked the record sixth consecutive above-average season in the Atlantic. The ongoing warm Atlantic multidecadal oscillation, which began in 1995, contributed to the season's high level of activity, as it led to above-average sea surface temperatures in the Atlantic basin. Other factors included the presence of a La Niña and abnormally heavy West African Monsoon precipitation.

Collectively, the tropical and subtropical systems of the 2021 Atlantic hurricane season caused 194 deaths and about $80.727 billion in damage, making it the third costliest season on record. Eight named storms struck the United States, which is the third most ever, behind only the previous season and 1916. In conjunction with 2020, 19 systems of at least tropical storm intensity made landfall in the country during the two seasons, surpassing the record of 15 during the 2004 and 2005 seasons combined. As a result, some regions significantly impacted during the 2020 season were once again hit hard in 2021, especially eastern Louisiana and portions of the Northeastern United States. Rhode Island was struck by two tropical systems, Elsa and Henri, an unusual occurrence especially given that the state had recorded no landfalls since Bob in 1991. Four tropical cyclones or their remnantsElsa, Fred, Ida, and Nicholaseach caused at least $1 billion in damage in the United States. The ACE index for the 2021 Atlantic hurricane season, as calculated by Colorado State University using data from the NHC, was approximately 146 units. The totals represent the sum of the squares for every (sub)tropical storm's intensity of over 39 mph (63 km/h), divided by 10,000. Therefore, the ACE index value does not include tropical depressions. Each season dating back to 2016 recorded ACE index values exceeding 129, which senior research associate Brian McNoldy of the University of Miami described as "unprecedented even for four years, let alone six!" Throughout the season, NOAA Hurricane Hunters logged 462.2 flight hours, conducting 58 eyewall passages and deploying 1,310 dropsondes in the process. NOAA also deployed 66 underwater gliders, which made 78,328 observations on oceanic salinity and temperatures. Additionally, NOAA used five unmanned saildrones to increase documentation on atmospheric and oceanic conditions across the Atlantic basin. One of the five saildrones became the first research vessel to ever enter a major hurricane when it reached Hurricane Sam on September 30.

Tropical Storm Ana formed on May 22, making 2021 the seventh consecutive year in which a tropical or subtropical cyclone formed before the season's official start. Ana formed in a location where no tropical storms within the month of May had been documented since before 1950. In mid-June, a rapidly developing non-tropical low offshore of the North Carolina coast became Tropical Storm Bill. The system lasted for only two days before becoming extratropical. Later that month, Tropical Storm Claudette formed just off the coast of Louisiana and Tropical Storm Danny developed offshore South Carolina. Overall, June featured three named storms, tied with 1886, 1909, 1936, and 1968 for the most during that month. Elsa formed on June 30 and became a tropical storm on the following day, making it the earliest fifth-named storm on record, surpassing the previous record by five days, set by Tropical Storm Edouard in 2020. It soon became the first hurricane of the season before impacting the Caribbean and making landfall in Cuba. Later, Elsa brought impacts to the Eastern United States, striking Florida on July 7 and New York and Rhode Island on July 9. Thereafter, activity came to a monthlong halt due to unfavorable conditions across the basin.

On August 11, Fred formed in the eastern Caribbean, bringing impacts to the Greater and Lesser Antilles, and the Southeastern United States. A few days later, Grace formed and strengthened into the second hurricane and first major hurricane of the season, and brought impacts to the Greater Antilles and the Yucatán Peninsula, before making landfall in the Mexican state of Veracruz. A third tropical system, Henri, developed on August 16, near Bermuda. Henri meandered for several days before becoming the third hurricane of the season on August 21 and impacted New England, causing record flooding in some places. Towards the end of the month, Hurricane Ida formed, leaving major damage in western Cuba before rapidly intensifying into a Category 4 hurricane and making landfall in southeastern Louisiana at peak intensity, producing widespread, catastrophic damage. Its remnants then generated a deadly tornado outbreak and widespread, record-breaking flooding across the Northeastern United States. Two other tropical storms, Julian and Kate, also existed briefly during this time but remained at sea. Larry formed on the last day of August and strengthened into a major hurricane early in September. It became the first hurricane to make landfall on Newfoundland since Igor in 2010. As the mid-point of the hurricane season approached, Mindy formed on September 8 and struck the Florida Panhandle shortly thereafter. It was followed by Nicholas, which developed on September 12 and made landfall along the central Texas coast two days later as a hurricane. Three tropical storms—Odette, Peter, and Rose—then formed in quick succession and were steered by prevailing winds away from any interaction with land. The busy pace of storm-formation continued late into September. Sam, a long-lived major hurricane, developed in the central tropical Atlantic and proceeded to rapidly intensify from a tropical depression to a hurricane within 24 hours on September 23 and 24. Sam peaked in strength on September 26 as a high-end Category 4 hurricane. It remained a major hurricane (Category 3 or stronger) for nearly eight consecutive days, the longest continuous stretch at that intensity for an Atlantic hurricane since Ivan, in 2004. Meanwhile, Subtropical Storm Teresa formed north of Bermuda on September 24. Short-lived Victor developed late in the month at an unusually low latitude of 8.1°N, tying Kirk in 2018 and behind only an unnamed 1902 hurricane (7.7°N) for the southernmost location in which an Atlantic system has reached tropical storm intensity.

However, tropical cyclogenesis then paused again for much of the month of October, primarily due to the presence of drier air. For the first time since 2006 and only the second time during the hyperactive era which began in 1995, no named storms developed between October 6 and October 30. Finally, Subtropical Storm Wanda formed in the central North Atlantic on October 30 and transitioned into a fully tropical storm on November 1. This system was the same storm that previously had brought rain and damaging wind gusts to southern New England as a potent nor'easter. Wanda remained a tropical cyclone until transitioning into an extratropical low on November 7, which marked the conclusion of activity during the 2021 Atlantic hurricane season.

Eastern & Central Pacific Oceans 

The 2021 Pacific hurricane season began on May 15 in the East Pacific and on June 1 in the Central Pacific. Overall activity included 19 named storms, 8 hurricanes, and 2 major hurricanes. The total of named storms was above the 1991–2020 average, while the number of hurricanes was average, and the sum of major hurricanes was below average. The official start date was preceded by the formation of Tropical Storm Andres, the earliest named storm on record in the East Pacific. It was accompanied by Tropical Storm Blanca later in May. The following month included the formations of tropical storms Carlos and Dolores, in addition to Hurricane Enrique. While Carlos remained away from land, Dolores made landfall on the Mexico coastline and Enrique delivered impacts across southwestern sections of the country while it passed just offshore. Above-average seasonal activity continued into July with the development of hurricanes Felicia and Hilda, Tropical Storm Guillermo, and Tropical Depression Nine-E; none of these cyclones impacted land. In August, Hurricane Nora made landfall along the west-central coastline of Mexico. Its formation was preceded by Hurricane Linda and tropical storms Ignacio, Kevin, and Marty, which did not impact land. September marked a stark turn around to the activity of the previous months, as it only featured Olaf, which struck San José del Cabo as a Category 2 hurricane. Two hurricanes – Pamela and Rick – moved ashore the Mexico coastline in October. An additional two storms, Terry and Sandra, developed in November, the fourth consecutive November with at least one named storm. Furthermore, those cyclones existed simultaneously, the first occurrence in the East Pacific during November on record. The Accumulated Cyclone Energy index for the 2021 Pacific hurricane season as calculated by Colorado State University using data from the National Hurricane Center was approximately 94 units, about 30 percent below average.

Western Pacific Ocean

On January 19, a tropical depression formed, becoming the first Northern Hemisphere tropical cyclone of the year and of the 2021 Pacific typhoon season. It brought minor damage to the Philippines. On February 16, another system formed, with the PAGASA giving it the name Auring and the JTWC designating the system as 01W. On February 17, it was named Dujuan by the JMA. After passing over Palau, it brought minor damage to the Philippines before dissipating on February 22. On March 14, a tropical depression formed near the Sulu Sea, though it was short-lived and it quickly degenerated back into a low-pressure area. On April 12, a tropical depression formed south of Woleai, and on the next day, the JMA upgraded it to a tropical storm, giving it the name Surigae. On April 16, it was given the name Bising by the PAGASA as it entered the Philippine Area of Responsibility. Surigae underwent rapid intensification, becoming the strongest tropical cyclone to form before May in the Northern Hemisphere. After bringing severe damages to the Philippines, it transitioned into an extratropical cyclone on April 24 and dissipated on April 30. On May 12, the JTWC began tracking a tropical depression, giving it the designation 03W with the PAGASA assigning it the local name Crising. It made landfall on the Philippines as a weak tropical storm, however damage was minimal due to the storm's small size. Two tropical depressions formed near Palau on May 29 and May 30 respectively, with the former being assigned the name Choi-wan by the JMA. Choi-wan moved through the Philippines before merging with the Meiyu front on June 4. After a week gap on June 11, another tropical depression formed over the South China Sea and it intensified further to a tropical storm named as Koguma. However, it remained short-lived and made landfall over the nation of Vietnam by the next day and soon dissipated thereafter. After 10 days on June 21, Tropical Storm Champi formed. As a tropical depression, it affected the Mariana Islands and Guam before intensifying into a weak typhoon. It became extratropical on 27 June. A tropical depression with its Filipino name, Emong, formed a couple hundred miles from Mainland China. The storm remained a tropical depression and later dissipated. Another tropical depression formed near Vietnam a couple days later, the storm later made landfall in the country as a weak tropical depression. A tropical depression formed later in the month having the Filipino name Fabian, later intensifying to  a tropical storm with the JMA giving it the name In-fa. In-fa later intensified to a typhoon, made several landfalls in China and dissipated on July 31. Meanwhile, Cempaka formed in the South China Sea and made landfall on Southern China and Vietnam causing moderate damage. Later, Tropical Storm Nepartak struck Miyagi Prefecture in Japan. The system had disturbed the ongoing Summer Olympics held in Japan. Nepartak was also the first tropical storm to hit Miyagi since records began in 1951. By the end of July, activities exploded as 8 systems formed within a week however, 5 of them were rather weak and dissipated without becoming tropical storms. The remaining 3 were named Lupit, Nida, and Mirinae. Lupit affected most of East Asia while Nida and Mirinae approached Japan but stayed away from land. Later, a tropical wave from the Central Pacific traveled a long distance and became a tropical storm over the Philippine Sea, which was named Omais (Isang). Omais caused minor damage to The Ryukyu Islands and South Korea. After Omais, the rest of August remained quiet when Conson formed off the coast of the Philippines and became a typhoon in less than 24 hours. Conson struck the Philippines and Vietnam causing severe damage. Then, Chanthu formed and became the second super typhoon of the season. Chanthu then headed over to the East China Sea where the system weakened and stalled. It later made landfall over Kyushu, Japan and dissipated south of the country. On September 21, two new systems formed and was named Dianmu and Mindulle. Dianmu headed over to Vietnam where it made landfall. Meanwhile, following Chanthu, Mindulle rapidly intensified into the season's third super typhoon. Mindulle weakened and strengthened multiple times due to cool dry air and cool sea-surface temperatures. Mindulle eventually passed through Japan's Izu Islands causing minor damage. On the start of October, Tropical storm Lionrock formed east of the Philippines and made landfall on the Chinese Island of Hainan. Soon, two tropical depressions named Maring and Nando formed. However, the two storms eventually merged into Tropical Storm Kompasu due to the storms being close to each other. Kompasu then intensified near typhoon strength and affected the same area where Lionrock had struck. The storm caused severe damage. Later, another tropical depression formed near Wake Island, which was eventually named Namtheun. Namtheun however, stayed away from any landmass and became an extratropical cyclone. On October 23, a tropical depression formed near Guam which then was named Malou. Malou reached its peak as a Category 2 typhoon but it did not effect any land. A day after Malou formed, another tropical depression formed near the Philippines and the JTWC designating the system as 26W. The storm then made landfall over Vietnam and dissipated. In November, Typhon Nyatoh being the only storm of the month formed southeast of Guam and unexpectedly rapidly intensified to a Category 4 super typhoon due to jet interaction. However, it was short lived and the JMA declared the storm became a remnant low. On December,  Typhoon Rai formed very late during the season and struck Palau and caused severe destruction in the Philippines. Rai also became a Category 5 super typhoon twice near the Philippines and in the South China Sea. Rai became the first Category 5 super typhoon since Nock-ten to form in the month on December. It was also the first Category 5 super typhoon recorded in the South China Sea other being Pamela in 1954 and Rammasun in 2014. Additionally, a tropical depression classified as 29W formed near the equator in the South China Sea. The depression then made landfall on Malaysia, flooding some states within the country.

North Indian Ocean

On April 2, a tropical depression formed in the north Andaman Sea near the Myanmar coast. It remained short-lived, however, dissipating the next day. It was the fourth system to form within the first fifteen days of April since the satellite era began in 1960. Formation during this time is considered rare since the first storm of a season usually forms in mid-April or May. A month later, on May 14, another tropical depression formed in the Arabian Sea. Later that day, it intensified into a cyclonic storm, being assigned the name Tauktae by the IMD. It intensified to an extremely severe cyclonic storm and made landfall on Gujarat. Ten days later another tropical depression formed in the Bay of Bengal in May 23, before strengthening into a cyclonic storm and receiving the name Yaas. It rapidly intensified further to a very severe cyclonic storm and made landfall in Odisha. Both of these storms caused considerable loss of lives and damage. On September 12, after a long period of inactivity, BOB 03 formed. BOB 03 intensified to a deep depression, before making landfall in India. It dissipated on September 15. On September 24, a tropical depression formed in the Bay of Bengal. It was designated BOB 04 by the IMD. In the next two days, it intensified into a cyclonic storm and was named Gulab. It made landfall in India. Later, the remnants of Gulab later re-intensified into Shaheen in the Arabian Sea. Shaheen entered the Gulf of Oman, where it became a Severe Cyclonic Storm. However, it struggled to intensify any further, due to lack of convection. Shaheen eventually made landfall near Al Suwaiq in the governorate of Al Batinah North in Oman. Shaheen became the first cyclone to hit the country since Cyclone Hikaa in 2019. It was also the first cyclone to enter the Gulf of Oman since Cyclone Gonu in 2007. On November 7, ARB 03 formed. It stayed out to sea and dissipated two days later. On November 10, a tropical depression formed. It was designated BOB 05 by the IMD. It was short lived, dissipating two days later. However, this depression caused severe flooding in Tamil Nadu and Andhra Pradesh.

South-West Indian Ocean

January - June

From the 2020 season, two systems crossed into the 2021 season after having formed during the previous year. The systems were Danilo, which peaked as a high-end severe tropical storm and briefly passed near the Mascarene Islands, and a tropical depression designated as 05 which entered the South-West Indian Ocean basin on December 28, causing a Fujiwhara effect with Danilo before dissipating on January 3. In the 2021 season, a tropical disturbance formed in the South-West Indian Ocean, which intensified into a tropical storm, being given the name Eloise. After making landfall on Madagascar, it rapidly intensified into a tropical cyclone in the Mozambique Channel before making a second landfall on Beira. Its remnants affected Zimbabwe, Eswatini, and South Africa. Joshua entered the basin from the Australian Region on the same day. On January 27, 10U from the Australian region entered the basin and was designated as Tropical Depression 09 before quickly dissipating thereafter.

On February 4, a tropical depression formed and intensified into a tropical cyclone named Faraji which further intensified into the season's first intense and very intense tropical cyclone. On February 10, a subtropical depression intensified into a tropical cyclone, being named Guambe and peaking as a Category 2 equivalent tropical cyclone. On March 1, Marian briefly entered the basin before exiting the basin the next day. On March 2, two tropical disturbances formed, and both intensified, being given the names Habana and Iman respectively. While Iman peaked as a moderate tropical storm and then dissipated, Habana continued to intensify and became the season's second intense tropical cyclone. After a short period of inactivity, a tropical depression designated as 15 formed on March 25, though it remained weak and dissipated by March 28.

On April 10, a low-pressure area formed, but due to unfavorable conditions, development was limited. By April 19, the low-pressure area intensified into a tropical depression. The tropical depression intensified shortly into a moderate tropical storm earning the name Jobo. It then rapidly intensified into a tropical cyclone before weakening due to an increase in wind shear, dissipating on April 24. Its remnant made landfall on Tanzania, causing little damages in the area.

July - December

The South-West Indian Ocean featured no storms forming during the year which became the first since the 1997–98 South-West Indian Ocean cyclone season.

Australian region

January - June

At the beginning of the 2021 season, a new tropical low formed in the Australian region near the Northern Territory of Australia, which further intensified into the first named cyclone of 2021, being given the name Imogen before making landfall on Far North Queensland. Another tropical low formed northeast of the Cocos Islands which lasted for five days and dissipated on January 10. Joshua formed on January 13 and crossed into the South-West Indian Ocean basin four days later. A new tropical low formed on January 16 near Queensland, which intensified into a cyclone named Kimi on the next day. Four additional tropical lows formed after Kimi, of which one managed to intensify into Cyclone Lucas before crossing into the South Pacific basin on February 3, while the other three had minor effects on land.

In the month of February, four tropical disturbances formed out of which two were named, being given the names Marian and Niran respectively. Marian formed on February 23 and rapidly intensified into a Category 3 severe tropical cyclone on the Australian scale. It briefly entered the MFR's area of responsibility between March 1 and March 2 before re-entering into the basin on March 3, where it peaked as a Category 4 severe tropical cyclone on the Australian Scale. Niran formed on February 27 and also rapidly intensified, peaking as a Category 5 severe tropical cyclone. Although it remained offshore, its slow-motion caused damage to banana crops in Queensland. Niran exited the basin on March 5. In March, three tropical lows developed, though they did not intensify into tropical cyclones.

In the month of April, four systems have formed, with two being named Seroja by TCWC Jakarta and Odette by BoM. The two systems engaged in a Fujiwhara interaction, with Seroja eventually absorbing Odette. The former would go on to intensify and strike Australia as a Category 3 severe tropical cyclone. On April 9, a tropical low formed off the east coast of Australia and quickly exited on the same day. On April 23, a late-season tropical low formed to the east of the Arafura Sea. On May 31 a very rare tropical low formed near the Cocos Islands and dissipated without any significant intensification on 4 June.

July - December

On November 10, a tropical low formed near the  island of Sumatra. However the storm dissipated a few days later. On November 17, another low formed which then formed into Paddy. Following Paddy, another depression formed near the Cocos Islands before exiting the basin. On November 29, Teratai formed south of Java Island however the cyclone struggled to develop due to the lack of sufficient outflow.

Ruby became a named storm on December 12, and intensified to category 1-equivalent strength before crossing into the South Pacific basin on December 13.

South Pacific Ocean

January - June

In January 2021, four tropical disturbances formed in the South Pacific, all four of which intensified into tropical depressions, with Ana and Bina intensifying into tropical cyclones. On February 1, Lucas entered from the Australian region and affected New Caledonia and Vanuatu. A tropical depression designated as 09F formed on February 7, before it was upgraded into a tropical storm by the JTWC. However, it accelerated southwards and became extratropical on February 11. Another tropical depression designated as 10F formed on February 22, before dissipating on February 24. Niran entered the basin on March 5 and caused extensive damage in New Caledonia before accelerating southeast as it transitioned into an extratropical cyclone. On March 5, a short-lived tropical depression designated as 11F existed from March 5 to March 6. On April 9, a tropical depression designated as 13F entered the basin, however, it dissipated on April 11 without intensifying into a tropical cyclone.

July - December

On December 13, the basin's first storm started off with Ruby, which entered the basin from the Australian basin as a Category 2 tropical cyclone on the Australian scale. Ruby eventually made landfall over New Caledonia.

South Atlantic Ocean 

On February 6, a weak system unofficially designated as 01Q was briefly tracked by the NOAA. The system formed and dissipated on the same day without being monitored by the Brazilian Navy. Another system formed on February 14 near Rio Grande do Sul, being designated as a subtropical depression by the Brazilian Navy. On April 19, a subtropical depression formed, although its precursor formed off the coast of Rio de Janeiro. On April 20 the subtropical depression gained strength and was classified as a subtropical storm by the Brazilian Navy, being assigned the name Potira. It brought gale-force winds to Copacabana.
On June 28, an extratropical cyclone in Uruguay transitioned into a subtropical depression on the evening of the same day, being given the designation Invest 1N by the NOAA.  A day later, the storm strengthened into a subtropical storm. On June 29, as the subtropical storm entered Brazilian maritime territory, the Brazilian Navy named it Raoni. On December 10, a subtropical cyclone evolved into a subtropical depression and on the morning of the same day it turned into a subtropical storm, called Ubá by the Brazilian Navy.

Systems

January

January was unusually above-average, with fourteen tropical cyclones forming and seven being named. Before that, two systems crossed into the 2021 season after having formed during the previous year. Danilo was one of the systems that crossed over, peaking as a severe tropical storm and briefly passing near the Mascarene Islands. A tropical depression designated as 05 entered the South-West Indian Ocean basin on December 28 and caused a brief interaction with Danilo before dissipating on January 3. In the Australian region, Cyclone Imogen formed on January 1 and affected Far North Queensland, bringing minimal damage to the area. Following Imogen, Cyclone Joshua, Cyclone Kimi, and Cyclone Lucas developed, with Joshua later entering the South-West Indian Ocean on January 17. Kimi threatened to strike the coast of Queensland, but weakened suddenly due to unexpected wind shear, remaining just offshore instead. Lucas formed on January 25 and entered the South Pacific basin on February 1. Additionally, four tropical lows formed in the basin, out of which one system entered the South-West Indian Ocean basin. In the South-West Indian Ocean, Cyclone Eloise formed and first made landfall on Madagascar as a severe tropical storm. It rapidly intensified over the Mozambique Channel and became the strongest storm of the month shortly before making a damaging landfall on Mozambique, with its remnants entering Zimbabwe, Eswatini, and South Africa. In the South Pacific, two tropical depressions formed, which were later assigned the names Ana and Bina, both of them affected Fiji and Vanuatu. In the West Pacific, a tropical depression formed, which became the first Northern Hemisphere tropical cyclone of 2021 and also marked the beginning of the 2021 Pacific typhoon season.

February 

February was slightly above-average, featuring eleven systems, of which five were named. One system was unofficial and another was subtropical. In the Australian region, two tropical lows formed on February 6 and 18 respectively. Cyclone Marian formed on February 23 and rapidly intensified, reaching Category 3-equivalent strength on February 28 with Niran following on February 27 and reaching Category 5 strength on both the Australian scale and the Saffir–Simpson scale, bringing impacts to Queensland and New Caledonia. In the South Pacific, a tropical depression formed north of Fiji and strengthened, though it accelerated southwards and became extratropical on February 11. Another tropical disturbance also briefly existed from February 22 to 24. In the South-West Indian Ocean, Cyclone Faraji formed and rapidly intensified, being classified as a very intense tropical cyclone before becoming the strongest storm of the month as it strengthened into the first Category 5-equivalent tropical cyclone in the basin since Cyclone Fantala in 2016. It also became the first very intense tropical cyclone recorded in the month of February. It then began to gradually weaken, dissipating on February 13. Another system formed on February 10 and made landfall on Mozambique before re-emerging back over water, and was given the name Guambe before reaching tropical cyclone status. In the Western Pacific, Tropical Storm Dujuan formed and became the basin's first named storm, bringing minor damage to the Philippines. In the South Atlantic, one system was unofficially monitored by NOAA, being given the unofficial designation of 01Q. However, the Brazilian Navy did not monitor the system. Another system formed near Rio Grande do Sul and was designated as a subtropical depression by the Brazilian Navy.

March 

March was slightly below-average, featuring nine tropical cyclones with only two being named. In the Australian region, five tropical lows formed on March 10, 18, 21, and 29 respectively. In the South Pacific, a tropical depression formed and was designated as 11F, though it was short-lived, dissipating the next day. In the South-West Indian Ocean, Habana formed and explosively intensified to an intense tropical cyclone, persisting for two weeks and reaching three individual peak intensities. Forming along with Habana was Tropical Storm Iman, which made landfall on Madagascar as a tropical depression and bringing heavy rainfall to Réunion, dissipating a few days later. In the West Pacific, a tropical depression formed on March 14, however it was short-lived, dissipating the same day.

April 

April was above-average, featuring nine systems, of which five were named. In the Australian region, Cyclone Seroja formed near East Timor and Indonesia. Its precursor caused catastrophic damage and deadly landslides in the West Nusa Tenggara and East Nusa Tenggara provinces of Indonesia and East Timor, causing 229 fatalities before strengthening to a Category 3 severe tropical cyclone and making a rare landfall on Midwestern Australia, becoming the first since Elaine in 1999. Odette also formed in the region near the Cocos Islands before undergoing a Fujiwhara interaction with Seroja quickly after its formation and later being absorbed by it. Additionally, two tropical lows formed on April 7 and April 9, of which one entered the South Pacific basin. In the North Indian Ocean, a short-lived tropical depression formed off the Myanmar coast in the north Andaman Sea, however it dissipated the next day. In the Australian region, a tropical low formed before later moving into the South Pacific basin, being designated as 13F; it was short-lived and dissipated on April 11. In the South-West Indian Ocean, Cyclone Jobo developed near the Seychelles, undergoing a brief period of rapid intensification before dissipating near Tanzania on April 24. In the West Pacific, Typhoon Surigae formed south of Woleai and rapidly intensified into a Category 5-equivalent typhoon, becoming the strongest typhoon recorded in the month of April as it passed near the Philippines. In the South Atlantic, Subtropical Storm Potira formed just off the coast of Rio de Janeiro, causing gale-force winds in Copacabana.

May 

May was well above average, even though tropical cyclogenesis started in mid-May. It featured the formation of nine systems, with six being named. In the Australian region near the Cocos Islands, an off-season tropical low formed before dissipating on June 3. In the East Pacific, Tropical Storm Andres formed and peaked as a tropical storm, becoming the earliest named storm in the basin in the East Pacific east of 140°W, breaking the previous record of Adrian in 2017 by twelve hours. Tropical Storm Blanca also formed and peaked as a tropical storm near the end of the month. In the North Atlantic, Tropical Storm Ana formed northeast of Bermuda as a subtropical storm before later transitioning into a tropical storm, marking the seventh consecutive Atlantic hurricane season to feature a storm formed before the official start date. In the North Indian Ocean, Cyclone Tauktae formed off the coast of Kerala and Lakshadweep and rapidly intensified to Category 4 equivalent storm, becoming the strongest storm of the month. It made a devastating landfall in Gujarat. Ten days later, Cyclone Yaas formed in the Bay of Bengal and intensified into a Category 1 equivalent strength, eventually making landfall in northwestern Odisha on May 26. Both storms brought considerable damage and loss of lives. In the West Pacific, a tropical depression formed on May 12 before making landfall on the Philippines and dissipating shortly thereafter. Tropical Storm Choi-wan and a tropical depression also formed later in the month, with Choi-wan peaking as a tropical storm. Choi-wan made several landfalls in the Philippines, causing severe damage. It later weakened into a tropical depression before transitioning into an extratropical cyclone.

June 

June was a slightly above average-month, featuring the formation of ten tropical cyclones with nine being named. In the East Pacific, Tropical Storm Carlos, Tropical Storm Dolores and Hurricane Enrique formed, with Dolores making landfall near the border between Michoacán and Colima in Mexico near hurricane strength, killing 3 people, while Enrique intensified to a hurricane in a similar location to Dolores later in the month, becoming the strongest storm of the month. In the North Atlantic, Tropical Storm Bill formed off the coast of North Carolina, Tropical Storm Claudette formed over southeastern Louisiana and brought heavy rain and severe weather to the Southeastern United States, while Tropical Storm Danny formed off the coast of South Carolina late in the month, tying the Atlantic for the most active June. In the North Atlantic, Hurricane Elsa formed, becoming the earliest fifth-named storm on record and beating the record of Tropical Storm Edouard of the previous year, bringing substantial damage to the Caribbean and eastern North America. In the West Pacific, Tropical Storm Koguma formed near Hong Kong and crossed Hainan before making landfall in Vietnam. Champi formed later in the month, passing close to Guam and the Northern Mariana Islands before recurving out to sea and then intensifying into a typhoon. In the South Atlantic, Subtropical Storm Raoni formed off the coast of Uruguay, causing some impacts in Montevideo and Punta del Este.

July 

July was average, featuring fourteen tropical cyclones, with seven being named. In the East Pacific, Hurricane Felicia and Tropical Storm Guillermo formed in the middle half of the month, with Felicia becoming the first major hurricane of its respective Pacific hurricane season. Hurricane Hilda would then form at the end of the month. In the West Pacific, two tropical depressions formed and were designated as 07W and 08W respectively. The former received the name Emong from PAGASA. Further into the month, two typhoons named In-fa and Cempaka and Tropical Storm Nepartak formed, with In-fa making landfall in China as severe tropical storm while Cempaka made landfall in Southern China as a typhoon; both were associated with the 2021 Henan floods. Nepartak, on the other hand, made landfall on the Miyagi Prefecture in Japan. The storm disturbed the ongoing Summer Olympics held in the country.

August 

August was fair-above average, featuring eighteen tropical cyclones, with sixteen of them being named. In the East Pacific, Tropical Storm Ignacio formed, but dissipated a few days later due to strong wind shear partially due to its proximity to Hurricane Hilda. Tropical Storm Kevin would then form a couple of days later, off the coast of Mexico with Hurricane Linda following shortly after, peaking as a low-end Category 4-equivalent hurricane. Linda was to be followed by Tropical Storm Marty and Hurricane Nora. In the West Pacific, tropical storms Lupit, Mirinae, Nida and Omais formed, with Lupit making landfall in China and Japan. In the North Atlantic, Tropical Storm Fred formed south of Puerto Rico and made landfall in the Florida Panhandle, with Hurricanes  Grace and Henri forming later. Grace impacted the Caribbean before making landfall on the Yucatán Peninsula before rapidly intensifying in the Bay of Campeche and making landfall as a category 3 hurricane in mainland Mexico. Henri would impact the Northeastern United States as a tropical storm, becoming the first tropical cyclone to make landfall in Rhode Island since Hurricane Bob in 1991. At the end of the month, Hurricanes Ida and Larry, as well as tropical storms Julian and
Kate, and  formed. Ida, which became the strongest storm of the month, brought impacts to Cuba before striking Louisiana on August 29, notably on the 16th anniversary of Hurricane Katrina, tying with Hurricane Laura of the previous year and the 1856 Last Island Hurricane as the strongest hurricane to make landfall in the state by maximum winds.

September 

September was well–above average, featuring nineteen storms, with fifteen of them being named. In the East Pacific, Hurricane Olaf being the only system in the basin, formed on the east coast of Mexico and later made landfall on the Baja California Peninsula as a Category 2 hurricane. In the West Pacific, Tropical Storms Conson and Dianmu, Typhoons Chanthu and Mindulle as well as three short-lived depressions formed, with Chanthu becoming the strongest storm of the month. Conson made a series of landfalls in the Philippines while Chanthu affected most of East Asia, due to the system stalling in the East China Sea. Mindulle on the other hand caused minor damage on Japan's Izu Islands. In the Atlantic, (Sub)Tropical Storms Mindy, Odette, Peter, Rose, Teresa, Victor as well as Hurricanes Nicholas and Sam formed. Mindy made landfall on St. Vincent Island in Florida, while Nicholas made landfall near Sargent in Texas. Hurricane Sam was a slow moving Category 4 hurricane which traveled across the Atlantic for two weeks. In the North Indian Ocean, Cyclonic Storm Gulab, Shaheen (a regeneration of Gulab), and BOB 03 formed. Gulab made landfall in India, causing minor damage. Soon, the remnants of Gulab regenerated into Shaheen in the Arabian Sea west of India. Shaheen entered the Gulf of Oman and eventually made landfall near Al Suwaiq in the governorate of Al Batinah North in Oman. Shaheen became the first cyclone to hit the country since Cyclone Hikaa in 2019 and was the first cyclone to hit the area since 1890. It was also the first cyclone to enter the Gulf of Oman since Cyclone Gonu in 2007.

October

October was unusually below-average, featuring only ten storms, with eight of them being named. The month also includes an unofficial cyclone named Apollo which formed in the Mediterranean Sea. In the East Pacific, two hurricanes named Pamela and Rick formed with both of them impacting Mexico. Pamela formed on the southern coast of Zihuatanejo where it made landfall in Sinaloa and then rapidly weakened to a tropical depression. Almost a week after Pamela dissipated, Rick formed south of Mexico and made landfall on the country as a Category 2 hurricane. In the West Pacific, Typhoon Malou, Tropical storms Lionrock, Kompasu, Namtheun, and along with two tropical depressions formed. One of the depressions was named Nando by the PAGASA. Nando formed east of another developing tropical depression, where it then merged with the depression and contributed to the formation of Kompasu. Lionrock struck Hong Kong, Southern China and Vietnam. Kompasu also affected the same area where Lionrock struck a week prior, causing severe loss of life and damage. The Atlantic was unusually quiet, only featuring a tropical storm named Wanda. Wanda developed from a strong late October nor'easter that had previously affected much of the Northeastern United States. The naming of Wanda made the 2021 Atlantic hurricane season the second season in a row after the previous year to run out of names on the standard naming list.

November

November was an average month in terms of activity, featuring eleven storms, of which six were named. The month also includes another unofficial cyclone named Blas which formed in the Mediterranean Sea near Spain. In the East Pacific, Tropical Storms Terry and Sandra formed, with both of the storms being named simultaneously on November 7. The West Pacific only featured a super typhoon named Nyatoh which developed near Guam, ending the record-long streak without a major tropical cyclone worldwide since October 3. Nyatoh became the strongest cyclone of November, later crossing into December and dissipating. In the North Indian Ocean, three depressions classified as ARB 03, BOB 05 and BOB 06 formed. BOB 05 caused severe flooding in Southern India and Sri Lanka which killed more than 40 people, with BOB 06 causing additional damages over the same places; the worst damages occurred in the Rayalaseema region of Andhra Pradesh. Additionally, a tropical low formed in the Southern Hemisphere which began the 2021–22 Australian region cyclone season. Later, another low formed which was then named Paddy. Following Paddy, a few more depressions formed but dissipated a few days later. At the end of the month, Tropical Cyclone Teratai formed south of Java but struggled to develop due to the lack of outflow. It then re-strengthened back into a tropical storm before weakening again and dissipating.

December

December was slightly inactive, featuring nine storms, with five of them being named. The month started off with the formation of Cyclone Jawad which formed in the North Indian Ocean. However, Jawad rapidly weakened due to wind shear shortly after being named, and degenerated into a low-pressure area before it could make landfall over West Bengal. The Western Pacific featured a tropical depression classified as 29W and a deadly and destructive typhoon, Typhoon Rai. Rai formed east of Palau before rapidly intensifying into a Category 5 super typhoon. It then made multiple landfalls on the Philippines causing serious damage. Rai then entered the South China Sea, re-strengthening into a Category 5 super typhoon east of Vietnam before dissipating near Hong Kong. Rai became the first Category 5 super typhoon since Nock-ten to form in the month on December. It was also the third Category 5 super typhoon recorded in the South China Sea, behind Pamela in 1954 and Rammasun in 2014. On the other hand, 29W formed near the equator before making landfall on Peninsular Malaysia, flooding some states within Malaysia. The Southern Hemisphere was inactive, only featuring three tropical lows and two cyclones named Ruby and Seth. Ruby intensified into a Category 2 tropical cyclone on the Australian scale and entered the South Pacific basin, making it the first storm in the basin. Ruby then made landfall on the French overseas island of New Caledonia. Seth, on the other hand, first originated in the Arafura Sea. It then wandered around the northern regions of Australia before being named in the Solomon Sea. The Southern Atlantic featured its third named storm of the year, Subtropical Storm Ubá.

Global effects
There are a total of nine tropical cyclone basins, seven are seasonal and two are non-seasonal, thus all nine basins are active. In this table, data from all these basins are added.

See also

 Weather of 2021
 Tropical cyclones by year
 List of earthquakes in 2021
 Tornadoes in 2021

Notes
2 Only systems that formed either on or after January 1, 2021 are counted in the seasonal totals.
3 Only systems that formed either before or on December 31, 2021 are counted in the seasonal totals.4 The wind speeds for this tropical cyclone/basin are based on the IMD Scale which uses 3-minute sustained winds.
5 The wind speeds for this tropical cyclone/basin are based on the Saffir Simpson Scale which uses 1-minute sustained winds.
6The wind speeds for this tropical cyclone are based on Météo-France which uses wind gusts.

References

External links

Tropical cyclones by year
 
2021 natural disasters